Gevorkyan or Gevorkian, also spelled Gevorgyan as a surname may refer to:

 Armen Gevorkyan is an Armenian amateur boxer.
 Artur Gevorkyan is a professional Turkmen football player.
 Ivan Gevorkian is a prominent Soviet Armenian surgeon and scientist.
 Lousine Gevorkian is the lead singer of the Russian band Louna.

See also
 Gevorgyan
 Kevorkian

Armenian-language surnames
Patronymic surnames
Surnames from given names